Sergey Ten (born 25 August 1976, Irkutsk) is a Russian political figure and a deputy of the 6th, 7th, and 8th State Dumas. 

From 1999 to 2001, Ten worked as Deputy General Director for Property and Strategic Development of Trud CJSC. In 2003, he was appointed the Head of the organization; he held that position until 2011. From 2006 to 2009, Ten was the Head of the Irkutsk branch of the Young Guard of United Russia. In 2011, 2016, and 2021, he was elected deputy of the 6th, 7th, and 8th State Dumas from the Irkutsk Oblast constituency, respectively.

References

1976 births
Living people
United Russia politicians
21st-century Russian politicians
Sixth convocation members of the State Duma (Russian Federation)
Seventh convocation members of the State Duma (Russian Federation)
Eighth convocation members of the State Duma (Russian Federation)
Politicians  from Irkutsk